Varatchaya Wongteanchai and Yang Zhaoxuan were the defending champions, but chose not to participate together. Wongteanchai played alongside Nao Hibino, but lost in the quarterfinals to Ashleigh Barty and Casey Dellacqua. Yang teamed up with Shuko Aoyama, but lost in the quarterfinals to Elise Mertens and İpek Soylu.

Barty and Dellacqua went on to win the title, defeating Nicole Melichar and Makoto Ninomiya in the final, 7–6(7–5), 6–3.

Seeds

Draw

References 
 Draw

Malaysian Open - Doubles